Aramecina is a municipality in the Honduran department of Valle.

Demographics
At the time of the 2013 Honduras census, Aramecina municipality had a population of 7,173. Of these, 97.99% were Mestizo, 1.42% White, 0.45% Black or Afro-Honduran and 0.14%  Indigenous.

References

Municipalities of the Valle Department